Laurence Steinberg (born 1952) is an American university professor of psychology, specializing in adolescent psychological development.

Career

Steinberg is a professor at Temple University in Philadelphia, where he is a Distinguished University Professor in the College of Liberal Arts, and where he holds a named position, the "Laura H. Carnell Professor of Psychology and Neuroscience". He is a Fellow of the American Psychological Association, the Association for Psychological Science, and the American Academy of Arts and Sciences, has been a Faculty Scholar of the William T. Grant Foundation, and was Director of the John D. and Catherine T. MacArthur Foundation Research Network on Adolescent Development and Juvenile Justice. Steinberg is a former president of the Division of Developmental Psychology of the American Psychological Association and of the Society for Research on Adolescence. Steinberg’s research has focused on a range of topics in the study of contemporary adolescence, including adolescent brain development, risk-taking and decision-making, parent-adolescent relationships, adolescent employment, high school reform, and juvenile justice. Steinberg proposed the Dual Systems Model of adolescent brain development. He has been a frequent consultant to state and federal agencies and lawmakers on child labor, secondary education, and juvenile justice policy. and expert witness in criminal trials of juveniles and young adults accused of serious violent crimes.

Steinberg has been the recipient of numerous honors, including the National Academy of Sciences Henry and Bryna David Lectureship; the John P. Hill Award for Outstanding Contributions to the Study of Adolescence, given by the Society for Research on Adolescence; the Society for Adolescent Medicine’s Gallagher Lectureship; the James McKeen Fellow Award, given by the Association for Psychological Science; and several lifetime achievement awards given by the American Psychological Association, including the Urie Bronfenbrenner Award for Lifetime Contribution to Developmental Psychology in the Service of Science and Society, the Award for Distinguished Contributions to Research in Public Policy, the Award for Distinguished Contributions to Developmental Psychology (formerly known as the G. Stanley Hall Award) and the Presidential Citation. In 2009, he was named the first recipient of the Klaus J. Jacobs Research Prize for Productive Youth Development. In 2014, he received the Elizabeth Hurlock Beckman Award, a national prize given to professors who have “inspired former students to make a contribution to society.”

Steinberg is the author of approximately 500 articles and essays on growth and development during the teenage years, and the author, co-author, or editor of 17 books, including Adolescence, the leading college textbook on adolescent development; When Teenagers Work: The Psychological and Social Costs of Adolescent Employment (with Ellen Greenberger); Crossing Paths: How Your Child’s Adolescence Triggers Your Own Crisis (with Wendy Steinberg); Beyond the Classroom: Why School Reform Has Failed and What Parents Need to Do (with Bradford Brown and Sanford Dornbusch); The 10 Basic Principles of Good Parenting, which has been published in 10 languages; You and Your Adolescent: The Essential Guide for Ages 10 to 25; Rethinking Juvenile Justice (with Elizabeth Scott); Age of Opportunity: Lessons From the New Science of Adolescence; and You and Your Adult Child: How to Grow Together in Challenging Times. He has also written for many popular outlets, including the New York Times, the Wall Street Journal, the Washington Post, Slate, and Salon.

Steinberg is frequently called upon to serve as an expert witness in cases involving juvenile offenders.
The Boston Globe called upon Steinberg to address, for its readers, the question as to whether 19-year-old Dzhokhar Tsarnaev, convicted of the 2013 Boston Marathon bombing, should be given a reduced sentence because he had always looked up to his older brother.

Age of Opportunity: Lessons from the New Science of Adolescence, was published by Eamon Dolan/Houghton Mifflin Harcourt in September 2014. While introducing Steinberg, prior to interviewing him about this book, for National Public Radio, Anya Kamenetz described how "his testimony has contributed to Supreme Court decisions abolishing the death penalty for juveniles and life without parole for juvenile offenders." Using Age of Opportunity as a starting point Wendy Leung, in The Globe and Mail credits Steinberg as "redefining" how we think about adolescence. Leung notes how Steinberg's study of “neuroplasticity” justifies considering adolescence continuing up until 25 years old, because individuals' brains were not fully formed at that age. This claim is dubious, however, as development of the prefrontal cortex region has been recorded to continue on even past the mid-30s, making 25 a possibly arbitrary cut-off point.' Steinberg himself has also commented on this in an interview, unsure of why age 25 has been considered the cutoff. The interview went into depth about how structural regions of the brain are seen to mature past the age of 30. He also believed that the neuroscience had acquired too big of a role, instead preferring it to be a supporting one in youth and young adult policymaking.

From 1983 to 1988, he was professor at University of Wisconsin–Madison and from 1977 to 1983, he was assistant and associate professor at University of California, Irvine. His PhD in developmental psychology is from Cornell University.

In a New York Times request-for-comment about lowering the legal drinking age, Steinberg responded that it should be lowered from 21 to 19, but not to 18 as is more commonly debated. At least two countries, namely Canada and South Korea, are known to have 19 as their drinking age.

He believes the age of majority should ultimately remain 18, as any higher would result in too many adults being classified as children, and a lower number may result in too many immature individuals being classified as adults. Ultimately he believes the age of maturity is somewhere between 15 and 22, on average.

Bibliography

Books 
 
 When Teenagers Work: The Psychological and Social Costs of Adolescent Employment (with Ellen Greenberger)
 Crossing Paths: How Your Child’s Adolescence Triggers Your Own Crisis (with Wendy Steinberg)
 Beyond the Classroom: Why School Reform Has Failed and What Parents Need to Do (with Bradford Brown and Sanford Dornbusch)
 The 10 Basic Principles of Good Parenting
 You and Your Adolescent: The Essential Guide for Ages 10 to 25
 Rethinking Juvenile Justice (with Elizabeth Scott)
 Age of Opportunity: Lessons From the New Science of Adolescence (Eamon Dolan/Houghton Mifflin Harcourt, 2014)
 You and Your Adult Child: How to Grow Together in Challenging Times

Articles 
 
———————
Notes

See also
Adolescent crystallization

References

External links

1952 births
Living people
American psychology writers
Cornell University alumni
New Scientist people
Temple University faculty
University of California, Irvine faculty
University of Wisconsin–Madison faculty
Vassar College alumni